Darva (also Romanized as Darvā’ and Darvā; also known as Darvāy-e Khosvīeh) is a village in Khosuyeh Rural District, in the Central District of Zarrin Dasht County, Fars Province, Iran. At the 2006 census, its population was 2,225, in 507 families.

References 

Populated places in Zarrin Dasht County